Alexander Vieweg (born 26 June 1986) is a German track and field athlete competing in the javelin throw. He competed in the 2008 Summer Olympics in Beijing, where he missed the final round after finishing 17th in his qualification group with 67.49 m. Vieweg has a personal best of 83.27 m.

Seasonal bests by year
2004 - 70.51
2005 - 75.85
2006 - 78.18
2007 - 79.56
2008 - 83.27
2009 - 79.00
2011 - 75.81

References

1986 births
Living people
German male javelin throwers
Athletes (track and field) at the 2008 Summer Olympics
Olympic athletes of Germany